Andrew Chang (born 15 December 1982) is a Canadian television journalist, best known as a co-anchor of CBC Television's nightly flagship newscast The National.

Early life 
Chang was born on 15 December 1982 in Ottawa and graduated from Carleton University with a degree in journalism. He grew up speaking English in a family where his father spoke Cantonese and his mother spoke Mandarin. After moving to Quebec, he became fluent in French.

Broadcasting career 
Chang joined the CBC in 2004 at CBC Montreal as a researcher. He was a part of CBC's broadcast team for the 2014 Winter Olympics. From 2014 to 2017, he was anchor of CBC Vancouver's News at 6. For this work, he won the Best News Anchor, Local award at the Canadian Screen Awards in 2016 and 2018. On 1 August 2017, he was named co-host of The National.

In June 2022, the CBC announced that Chang would be stepping away from The National, and moving to host a new daily program for the CBC's forthcoming streaming news service. His program, About That, launched on CBC News Explore on November 30, 2022.

References

External links
 CBC biography
 

1982 births
Living people
21st-century Canadian journalists
Canadian journalists of Chinese descent
Canadian Screen Award winning journalists
Canadian television news anchors
Carleton University alumni
CBC Television people
People from Ottawa